The Wrath of the Gods may refer to:

 The Wrath of the Gods (1914 film), an American silent drama film
 The Wrath of the Gods, an unproduced film from The Wicker Man film series
 Wrath of the Gods, a 1994 adventure video game
 The Seven Deadly Sins: Wrath of the Gods, an anime television series

See also
 Wrath of Gods, a 2006 documentary film
 Wrath of God (disambiguation)